"Hurt Me" is a song by British singer Låpsley. It was released on 20 August 2015 as the fourth single from Låpsley's debut studio album, Long Way Home.

Reception
James Rettig from Stereogum said "The track begs for feeling, even if it's a bad one, and the ticking clock of a beat in the background makes everything just a little bit more urgent". Nic Kelly from Project U called the song "Pop Perfection" saying it "is emotional balladry at its most divine, honest and relevant".

Track listing

Charts

Certifications

References

2015 singles
2015 songs
Songs written by Jimmy Napes
Songs written by Tourist (musician)